Dream thieves may refer to:
The Dream Thieves, the second novel of The Raven Cycle by author Maggie Stiefvater
"Dreamthieves", a song by Kim Mitchell from his 2007 album Ain't Life Amazing
"The Dreamthieves", a song by the Sword from their 2015 album ''High Country